Cego is a card game for three or four players played with eponymous German Tarot playing cards. The game was probably derived from the three-player Badenese game of Dreierles after soldiers returned from the Iberian Peninsula during the Napoleonic Wars and, based on Spanish games they had encountered, introduced Cego's distinctive feature: a concealed hand, or blind (Spanish: ciego, Portuguese: cego). Cego has experienced a revival in recent years, being seen as part of the culture of the Black Forest and surrounding region. It has been called the national game of Baden and described as a "family classic".

History and development 
Sometimes called Baden Tarock, historically also Zeco, Zego, Zigo, Caeco, Cäco and Ceco (meaning blind), Cego is seen as part of the cultural heritage of the Black Forest and South Baden region. After the defeat of Further Austria, in 1805 much of its territory was allocated to the Grand Duchy of Baden. During the ensuing Napoleonic Wars, soldiers from Baden deployed with Napoleon's troops to Spain where, among other things, they learnt a new card game, Ombre. Recent research suggests that they took elements of this game back to Baden and modified the Tarot game of Dreierles which was played with Tarock playing cards that were then still in popular use in southern Germany. The result was the game of Cego which became sufficiently popular to develop into the national game of Baden and Hohenzollern and these are the only regions of Germany where Tarot or Tarock cards are still used for playing games.

The military background to this is that, in 1808, the Grand Duchy of Baden was ordered by Napoleon to raise additional troops in the shape of a 1,733 strong regiment which was deployed for the following six years to the Iberian Peninsula under Major General Heinrich von Porbeck, where it fought at the Battles of Talavera and Vitoria as well as against Spanish guerrilleros. It suffered heavy casualties, only 500 soldiers returning to Baden by 1814.

The game is certainly known to have been played as early as 1839 when Albin Katz returned from Rotterdam after rafting timber down the Rhine. On his return he stayed in Karlsruhe and came across other rafters playing Cego but with cards he'd never seen before, depicting scenes from cities like London and Hamburg. The Fool was dressed in a costume from the city of Mainz and the pack is known as the Mainzer Karneval. They were presumably not specifically Cego cards.

The first known mention of dedicated packs comes in 1852 when used Zego (Tarrok) cards are offered for sale "at a cheap price" by a restauranteur in Karlsruhe. The earliest full description of Cego's rules appears in 1860 in a treatise on Zigo which includes details of rules for 3 and 4 players as well as a song. Even at that early stage there were two Solo, two Gegensolo and several Zigo contracts, but no special games such as Piccolo or Bettel. As Zego it appears in 1868 in a Rhenish-Swabian poem about the game called Die Begischten. In 1901, Cego was reported to be one of the most popular penny ante games in the city of Pforzheim in Baden alongside Sixty-Six, Skat, Tapp and Tarrock (possibly Grosstarock or Dreierles).

In 1907 there were both 42- and 54-card versions and it was described as "especially popular in Baden". Meanwhile the Baden Landtag (government) had banned the Gendarmerie "for disciplinary reasons" from playing Cego in 1914.

A sketchy description of apparently simpler rules for Cego-Tarock, with just three contracts, is given by Robert Hülsemann in 1930. However, the first special contracts appear in print in 1950: Pikkolo, where the declarer must take exactly 1 trick, and Bettel, in which the declarer must not take any tricks. By 1960, however, the game had declined in popularity to such an extent that it was only found in "remote off-the-beaten-path localities" in Baden and Hohenzollern and played mainly by the elderly.

In 1967, a Ramsch contract appears; played when all pass, it is simply Räuber under a different name. No tariffs are given. The Cego bid of Half (Ein Halbe) only appears in online sources within the last decade and is not universal. The Ultimo contract, in which the sole aim is to take the last trick with the lowest trump and which is a constant feature of Tarot games since the earliest rules, does not appear in print until 2005 and is clearly a borrowing. John McLeod records the contract as Ulti in 1997 being played in Bräunlingen.

Cego's decline has been reversed in recent years as it has become seen as a traditional part of Baden and Black Forest culture. The game has grown organically and there are many regional variations but in recent years, the establishment of a Cego Black Forest Championship has led to official tournament rules being defined. In addition, regular courses and local tournaments are held and it is a permanent feature of Alemannic Week, held annually in the Black Forest at the end of September.

The noted German economist Gerold Blümle has researched, lectured, taught and written on the subject of "Baden's national game of Cego" and has done much to promote the game. Today, Cego is played mainly in the Upper Rhine valley, the Black Forest, the adjacent Baar lowland and around Lake Constance in Switzerland and Austria. A project to revive and promote the game and run live and online courses is being supported by Black Forest actor and cabaret artist, Martin Wangler. Cego courses are run in the autumn by the Dreisamtal and High Black Forest Colleges (Volkshochschule Dreisamtal and Volkshochschule Hochschwarzwald), regional folk high schools.

Cego was also recorded as being played in Switzerland on the border with Baden in the late 20th century.

Pack

Cego traditionally uses a French-suited tarot pack of German design; two distinct patterns being still in use. 
In each case, the remaining cards (court and pip cards) are of the suits: Clubs, Spades, Hearts and Diamonds. In addition to the King, Queen, and Jack, there is also a Knight or Cavalier. Court cards cannot beat trumps, but are important because of their card value with respect to the total of points and their ability to win a suit trick. Pip cards have neither high card value nor are they very useful in winning tricks. Like the Austrian Industrie und Glück deck, the red pip cards are numbered from one to four (one being the highest card) and the black pip cards are numbered from ten to seven, with no corner indices.

Adler Cego pattern 

The most common type of Cego pack still in production is an Animal Tarot deck that dates to the early 19th century.  Although originally comprising 78 cards, it was shortened to 54 cards to play Cego. The name "Adler Cego" (Eagle Cego) was coined when shortened packs for the game were manufactured by Lennhoff & Heuser in 1879–1882 and referred to a small eagle printed on the Q, the eagle being the symbol of the city of Frankfurt where the cards were made. The firm was sold to V.A.S.S. in 1882, who have continued to produce it, without the eagle, until the present day. Packs for Cego had been produced since at least 1852, but it is not known whether they were of the Animal Tarot type or another pattern that preceded the Encyclopaedic Tarot also used for Cego.

The shortened Animal Tarot pack comprises 22 trumps, 16 face cards (images) and 16 pip cards (empty cards). Trump 1 shows the Kleiner Mann ("Little Man", based on Hanswurst) but is typically called the Geiss ("nanny goat"), while trump 2 has mythological hybrids. Trumps 3 to 21 depict real animals. The highest trump lacks  the pink panels that the other trumps have on both ends of the cards depicting its rank in Arabic numerals. Instead, it shows a gleeman and is called the Stieß, G'stieß or Geiger (fiddler or violinist, see also The Fool). Despite the name Adler, the former eagle symbol does not appear on any of the cards today. The last manufacturer of this deck is ASS Altenburger.

Bourgeois Tarot pattern 

The second type of pack in current use is one originally produced by F.X. Schmid, again dating to the 19th century. This is a variant of the Bourgeois Tarot with genre scenes of rural and town life based on woodcuts by Ludwig Richter. The same pack was produced by Bielefelder Spielkarten from 1955 to 1974 and the pattern was also manufactured by A.S.S. In the 1970s, this was the most common pattern used for playing Cego, but more recently ASS have only released it through a couple of outlets. It is sometimes called the Black Forest Cego pattern.

Another variant of Bourgeois Tarot, the French Tarot Nouveau deck, was also sometimes used, particularly in Alsace. When using a 78-card Tarot Nouveau deck, the Aces to sixes are removed from the blacks suits (Spades and Clubs) and the fives to tens are extracted from the red suits (Hearts and Diamonds). This then conforms to the 54-card pack needed for four-handed Cego.

Black Forest pattern 
In autumn 2023, a new pattern is planned for release. Designed by local graphics design artist, Anita Schwörer, it follows the Adler Cego concept, but replaces the court figures with images of people in local costume and the domestic and wild animals of the Adler Cego pack with animals native to the Black Forest, such as grouse, deer, badger, wild boar and squirrel.

Card names and values 

The three high value trumps are known as the Trull from the French tous les trois (all three). The blind is variously known as the Blinde, Leger or Cego.

Rules

Overview 
Cego has no standard or official rules. Every region where it is played has established its own traditional rules and they sometimes differ even within the same village. The following rules are for four players and largely follows those by Gerhard Baumann and Gerold Blümle, of the Black Forest Club at Schopfheim, supplemented by other sources where indicated.

There is an auction in which players bid for various contracts or 'games' to become the declarer and play alone against the three defenders. In normal games, the declarer aims to take more card points than the others combined. In special games there are different aims and in negative special games every player plays for him- or herself. Deal, bidding and play are anti-clockwise.

Deal
The dealer deals the top 10 cards of the pack to the table, face down, and then 11 to each player in turn and in a single packet. The 10 table cards form the blind.

Auction

Phase 1 - Hand games 
In Phase 1 players bid for Hand games: Solo or Ultimo. In these games, players use their hand cards, not the blind.

 Solo. Forehand (to the right of the dealer) opens and players, in turn, pass by saying "fort" or bid "Solo!"  If Solo is bid and no one counters it, the Solo bidder becomes the declarer and plays against the three defenders. The cards in the blind belong to the Solo player but may not be viewed or scored until the end.
 Counter-Solo. Once Solo is announced, a subsequent player, in turn, may call "Counter-Solo!" which is a bid to play a Cego (see below) and cannot be overcalled.
 Ultimo. A player confident of winning the last trick with the Geiss may call "Ultimo!" which ends the auction immediately and is played. If the declarer takes the last trick with the Geiss the game is won; otherwise it is lost. Ultimo must be called before the Solo bidding begins. Under some rules, forehand must ask if anyone has an Ultimo before opening the bidding.

If all pass, players may call a special, or Null, game before Phase 2. If two or more players want to play the same special game, positional priority applies. The options are:

 Piccolo. The declarer must take exactly one trick or the game is lost. It ranks over all other games except Ultimo.
 Bettel. As Piccolo but the declarer must lose every trick.

Phase 2 - Cego games 
If Counter-Solo was bid, it ends the auction and a Cego is played as described below. If all pass in Phase 1 and no specials were bid, there is now an auction of bidding with immediate hold. Forehand opens by calling "Cego" and subsequent players, in turn, either fold by saying "good" or "fort", or name the next higher bid; no jump bidding being allowed. If a later player overcalls a bid, the earlier bidder may hold by saying "mine" or "my game" otherwise must fold. If a bid is held, the later player must raise to the next level or fold. As soon as either folds, the next player in turn may fold or name the next game. This continues until three have folded, whereupon the successful bidder becomes the declarer and plays the announced game. It may not be raised further. Possible bids are:

 Cego. The declarer keeps 2 hand cards, setting aside the rest as the Legage, picks up the blind and discards 1 more card to end up with 11 cards in hand.
 One-er (Eine). The declarer keeps 1 card, sets aside the rest, picks up the blind and plays with it.
 One Pip (Eine Leere). The declarer lays 1 pip card down face up, sets the rest aside, and picks up the blind. The pip is led to the first trick.
 Two Pips (Zwei Leere). The declarer lays 2 pip cards of the same suit face up on the table, sets the rest aside, picks up the blind, discards 1 card and leads the pips to the first 2 tricks.
 Two Odds (Zwei Verschiedene). As Two Pips, except that the 2 cards must be of different suits.
 Geiss. The highest bid. A player with the Geiss keeps it and sets the rest aside, picking up the blind. The Geiss must be led to the first trick (which it will lose); the declarer then continues to play with the blind.

In all Cego games, the Legage and any discards count to the declarer at the end.

Special forehand games 
If forehand bids Cego and the rest pass, forehand may announce a (negative) game:

 Räuber.  All play for themselves and the loser is the one with the most points. The game is doubled for each player who takes no tricks. If forehand loses, the game is doubled.
 Drescher. Whoever takes the last trick loses. If this is the declarer the game is lost double.

Play 
The aim is to amass more card points than the opposition. The declarer leads to the first trick. Players must follow suit if able, otherwise must trump. Only if unable to do either, may a player discard any card. There is no compulsion to head the trick. A trick is won by the highest trump or, if no trumps are played, by the highest card of the led suit.

In Two Pips and Two Odds, the declarer also leads to the second trick, regardless of who wins the first.

Scoring 
In the normal games (Solo and Cego games), players work out their card points based on the usual Tarock scoring system whereby cards taken in tricks  are counted in groups of three, the value of each group being 2 points fewer than the combined point value of the three cards. For example, K C J = 5 + 3 + 2 - 2 = 8 card points and Truck 14, Truck 11 and Truck 1 (Geiss) = 1 + 1 + 5 - 2 = 5 points. Two blanks (ordinary Trucks or pip cards) left over score 1 point; a single blank scores nothing. With this system, there are 70 card points in the pack and the declarer needs at least 36 to win; scoring 35-35 is win for the defenders. In normal games, the cards in the blind always count to the declarer.

In social rounds, the game value is the amount in (euro) cents earned by the declarer from each defender if the game is won. If it is lost, the declarer pays the same to each defender. In tournaments or other games where points are reckoned, the game value is earned in plus points and paid in minus points. A Solo wins double and loses single; a Countersolo wins fourfold and loses double.

Example: if Anna wins a One Pip game (game value 3) with 47 card points, she earns 3 x 3 = 9 cents from each defender (see green cell above) i.e. a total of 27 cents. If game points are used instead of money, Anna scores +27 and each defender -9 game points. If Anna loses the game with 27 card points, she pays each defender 2 x 3 = 6 cents (see red cell above), paying out a total of 18 cents. In soft score, she would deduct -18 games points and each defender would score + 6.

In the special games (Ultimo, Bettel, Piccolo and Räuber), a fixed score or payment is made. These vary widely; the table illustrates payments by Grupp (1994), Baumann & Blümle (2013), the Cegofreunde St. Georgen (2012), Weißauer (2017), Kastner & Folkvord (2005) and cego-online (2011)

The blind is ignored in special games.

Penalties for revoking 
For transgressions, such as the declarer forgetting to discard and has one card too many at the end, the game is lost. By pre-agreement, such an infraction may incur an eightfold loss of the game.

Going "up the mountain" 
One tradition in the High Black Forest is that a player who plays a Cego fails to take a single trick has to go "up the mountain". The player buys a round of schnaps and the others stand and sing the opening line of the Lake Constance Song (Bodenseelied) substituting the player's name e.g. "Auf dem Berg so hoch da droben, da steht der Karl" ("On the mountaintop so high above, there stands Karl").

Variations 
There are many local and regional variations in the rules. The following is a selection:

Solo variations 
 Regulated Solo. If players agreed to play Solo 'with regulations', then a player with more than 8 trumps – or 7 trumps, 2 of which are higher than 16, and only 2 suits – must call a Solo. Failure to do so is called reneging (Schinden, lit. "flaying" or "flogging", but implying a 'holding back'.) and may result in a challenge before play begins. If a renege is exposed the reneger loses eightfold; if there has been no renege, the challenger loses eightfold.

Schinden is not cheating, but a legal way of conduct bearing the risk of being caught.

 Held Counter-Solo. The Solo bidder may hold, and thus play, a bid of Counter-Solo.
 Counter-Solo auction. A call of Counter-Solo (which equates to a Cego) triggers part 2 of the auction in which players may bid higher. Further bidding starts with the player to the right of the Counter-Solo bidder and players must bid higher or fold by saying "good". The game values all increase by 1.
 March. A Solo bidder may also announce a March or Solo March (Durchmarsch), which is an undertaking to make every trick.

Special game variations 
 Ultimo variations. In some regions Ultimos are also played with the 2- or 3-trump or with specific combinations of 1-, 2-, and 3-trumps. Other Ultimo contracts include:
 Solo Ulti. The declarer has to win a Solo as well as taking either the last trick with the Geiss, the penultimate trick with the Truck 2 or the pre-penultimate trick with the Truck 3. The declarer may opt to go for two or even all three Ultimo feats.
 Solo Durch. The declarer has to win all tricks.
 Solo Ulti Durch. The declarer must take all tricks and the specified Ulti trick or tricks announced.
 Pascha. The declarer holds the three highest Trucks – Stiess, Mond and trump 20 – and must take exactly 3 tricks with them. Valued at 30 cents.
 Duo, Zwiccolo, Mord or Duccolo. The declarer must take exactly 2 tricks. Another name is Grebsler, valued at 15 cents.
 Trio The declarer must take exactly 3 tricks.
 Quarto. The declarer must take exactly 4 tricks.
 Quinto. The declarer must take exactly 5 tricks.
 Ouverte games. A special may be played ouverte in which case the game scores double.

 Forehand special variations 
Sometimes two versions of Räuber are played:
 Regulated Räuber. The player with the Gstieß must play it to the first trick. The Mund (21) must be played to the second and the Geiß (1) to the third trick. If any of these cards is in the blind, the top three trumps are led, in descending order.
 Wild Räuber. Name given to the ordinary Räuber to distinguish it from the regulated version. Weißauer adds that, if forehand ties with another player for highest points, forehand loses.

Cego game variations 
 Half, Half-er (Halbe, Halber) In many places there is an intermediate bid of Half between Cego and One-er. The declarer adds one card to the blind and plays a pip card face up, setting aside the remaining hand cards which, as usual, count to the declarer at the end. The declarer plays with the blind and may exchange the pip card with a face card in hand. The game value is x2 and the remaining games are increased by one e.g. a One-er is x3, One Pip is x4, etc.
 Two Pips with trump discard. The declarer must also discard the lowest trump from the blind, showing it to the others first.
 Two Odds with trump discard. The declarer must also discard the highest trump from the blind.
 Viewing discards. The discarded tricks may be viewed until after the third trick of the game.

Scoring variations 
In some parts of the Black Forest, a simplified card point scoring system is used which involves counting the cards in pairs. If there are no counters (court cards or Trull cards) in a pair it scores 1 point, if one card is a counter it scores the full amount and if both cards are counters, 1 point is deducted. This gives 80 points in the pack and 40 are needed for a win.

Three-hand Cego 
The three player game has the following key differences:

 It is played with 51 cards, the 7, 7 and 4 being removed.
 Each player is dealt 13 cards and 12 go into the blind.
 Because there are only 69 card points in the pack, the declarer always gets a bonus point.
 If Regulated Solo is played, a player with more than 9 trumps – or 8 trumps, 2 of which are higher than 16, and only 2 suits – must call a Solo. 
 Null games, such as Piccolo and Bettel are not played.

Footnotes

References

Literature 
 _ (1907). Herders Konversations-Lexikon, Vol. 8 (Spinnerei–Zz). 3rd edn. Freiburg im Breisgau: Herder. Also Berlin, Karlsruhe, Munich, Strasbourg, Vienna and St. Louis, MO.
 Bamberger, Johannes (1999). "Cego" in Die beliebtesten Kartenspiele. Vienna, Munich: Perlen-Reihe. pp. 65–73. 
 Baumann, Gerhard and Gerold Blümle (2022). Das Cegospiel. Schwarzwaldverein Schopfheim.
 Bielefeld, A. (1868). Rheinschwäbisch. Humoristische Gedichte vom Verfasser "des weiland Gottlieb Biedermaier". Karlsruhe: A. Bielefeld.
 
 Boerschel, Ernst (1915). Josef Viktor von Scheffel und Emma Heim: eine Dichterliebe, mit Briefen und Erinnerungen. Hesse & Becker.
 Castelli, Ignaz Franz (1839). Freut euch des Lebens! Oder: Wollen wir lachen und fröhlich seyn ..., Volume 5. Vienna: A. Mausberger.
 Dummett, Sir Michael and John McLeod (1975). "Cego" in The Journal of the Playing-Card Society, Vol. 4, No. 1, Aug 1975, pp. 30–46. ISSN 0305-2133. 
 Gööck, Roland (1967). "Cego" in Freude am Kartenspiel, Bertelsmann, Gütersloh. pp. 126–128.
 Grupp, Claus D (1979) [1975]. "Cego" in Karten-spiele, Falken, Niederhausen. pp. 94–97. [Rev. edn. 2000] 
 Grupp, Claus D (1986) [1976]. "Cego" in Schafkopf Doppelkopf, Falken, Niedernhausen. pp. 84–94. 
 Grupp, Claus D (1994). "Cego" in Doppelkopf Schafkopf, Falken, Niedernhausen. pp. 82–92. 
 Harder, Hans-Joachim (1987). Militärgeschichtliches Handbuch Baden-Württemberg. Militärgeschichtliches Forschungsamt (publ.), Stuttgart: Kohlhammer, ISBN 3-17-009856-X.
 Hoffmann, Detlef (1972). Die Welt der Spielkarte. Callway.
 Hülsemann, Robert (1930). "Cego-Tarock" in Das Buch der Spiele für Familie und Gesellschaft. Leipzig: Hesse & Becker. pp. 205–206.
 Kastner, Hugo and Gerald Kador Folkvord (2005). "Cego (Badisches Tarock)" in Die große Humboldt-Enzyklopädie der Kartenspiele, Humboldt, Baden-Baden. pp. 226–230. 
 Weißauer, Jürgen (2016). "Cego" in Modernes Skatspiel – Binokel, Cego und Vira. pp. 108–133.
 
 P.A. (1860). Historische Entwicklung der praktische Regeln des Zigo-Taroc-Spieles. Mannheim: J. Schneider.
 Pieper, Sven and Bärbel Schmidt (1994). "Cego" in Kartenspiele, Reclams Universalbibliothek, Vol. 4216, Stuttgart. pp. 98–106.
 Stolz, Aloys (1901). Geschichte der Stadt Pforzheim. Städt. Tagblatts.
 von Weech, Friedrich (1892). "Badische Truppen in Spanien 1810–1813" in Badische Neujahrsblätter, 2nd issue, 1892. pp. 3–59.

External links 
Cego sites
 Cego – website dedicated to Cego (in German)
 Cego-online – website dedicated to Cego (in German).
Cego rules
 Cego – rules and variations at pagat.com (in English).
 Der Spielablauf auf Basis der Regeln bei der Schwarzwaldmeisterschaft – rules of the Black Forest Championship (in German)
 Historische Entwicklung der praktischen Regeln des Zigo-Taroc-Spieles – earliest known rules (in German)
 Regionale Besonderheiten – regional rules (in German)
 Cegofreunde St. Georgen – St. Georgen rules and table (in German)
Card images
 Traditional Adler Cego pack by ASS Altenburger
 Cego pack with genre scenes by F.X. Schmid
 Microscopique Tarock pack by Dondorf of Frankfurt.
Cego articles
 "Das badische Nationalspiel Cego". Article by Blümle in the  Wirtschaftliche Freiheit, 30 July 2018 (in German)
 Cego spielen ist Adrenalin pur – interview about Cego with actor Martin Wangler
 Cego-Lied – the "Cego Song" by Martin Wangler

Tarot card games
German card games
19th-century card games
Three-player card games
Four-player card games